Parkside Collegiate Institute (PCI), with a population of over 1,000 students, is the largest of four secondary schools in St. Thomas, Ontario.  It is part of the  Thames Valley District School Board.  Parkside was built to replace one of the original schools in St. Thomas, the former St. Thomas Collegiate Institute.

Programs
Parkside is a composite school offering pathways for those bound for the workforce, for college and for university.  It is the only secondary school in Elgin County that offers a French Immersion program. Such programs include mechanics, arts, sciences, technology and mathematics, along with several others to choose from, ranging from study of careers, to studies of languages. In the fall of 2019, Parkside opened a Spanish course. Parkside also has many extracurricular activities, such as golf, curling, fishing, tennis, badminton, basketball, baseball, volleyball, football, rugby, soccer, hockey, field hockey, track and field, grade 9–12 band, cheerleading, choir, robotics and improv.  Parkside also has a Community Living Centre that serves the needs of developmentally challenged pupils.

Facilities
Facility upgrades include the resurfacing of the rubberized track, the installation of lights around the football field, the construction of a greenhouse, the addition of solar panels to the school roof, and the construction of a storage building for the extracurricular Canadian football program. Construction for a new learning commons (library) has recently been completed.(2019)

2007 fire
In early February 2007, there was a fire at Parkside that damaged the cafetorium and caused smoke damage in the music and art rooms. Repairs were complete by September 2007.

See also
List of high schools in Ontario

References

External links
The Parkside Collegiate Institute Alumni Association

High schools in St. Thomas, Ontario
Educational institutions established in 1967
1967 establishments in Ontario